Silvio Pedroni (24 January 1918 – 13 June 2003) was an Italian cyclist. He competed in the individual and team road race events at the 1948 Summer Olympics. He also rode in the 1949 Tour de France.

References

External links
 

1918 births
2003 deaths
Italian male cyclists
Olympic cyclists of Italy
Cyclists at the 1948 Summer Olympics
Cyclists from the Province of Cremona